Galitskaya is a rural locality (a village) in Pyatovskoye Rural Settlement, Totemsky  District, Vologda Oblast, Russia. The population was 84 as of 2002. There are 4 streets.

Geography 
Galitskaya is located 3 km north of Totma (the district's administrative centre) by road. Varnitsy is the nearest rural locality.

References 

Rural localities in Tarnogsky District